Taj Mahal is a 2015 French-Belgian thriller drama film  written and directed by . It  was screened in the Horizons section at the 72nd edition of the Venice Film Festival. The story of the film makes explicit reference to the 2008 Mumbai attacks which have concerned The Taj Mahal Palace Hotel.

Plot 
Taj Mahal is about the Taj Mahal Palace and Tower Hotel in Mumbai near the Gateway of India. It was one of the sites of the 26/11 2008 Mumbai attacks. There are various documentaries and films made about the 26/11 Mumbai Terrorist Attack. The movie of Ram Gopal Verma The Attacks of 26/11 which was also based on the 2008 Mumbai attacks was released on 1 March 2013 in India. This movie is made by Frenchman Nicolas Saada, and was released at Venice Film Festival 2015. It tells the story of a teenager, played by Stacy Martin, who has come to Mumbai with her parents and is staying at the Taj Hotel. She is trapped when the terrorists attack the hotel and her parents are out for dinner.

Cast 
 Stacy Martin as Louise
 Louis-Do de Lencquesaing   as Louise's Father
 Gina McKee   as Louise's Mother
 Alba Rohrwacher as  Giovanna
 Frédéric Épaud as  Pierre

References

External links 
 

2015 thriller drama films
French thriller drama films
Belgian thriller drama films
Films about terrorism in India
Films set in Mumbai
Films based on the 2008 Mumbai attacks
2015 drama films
2015 films
2010s French-language films
French-language Belgian films
Thriller films based on actual events
2010s French films